Palantepe is a village in Mut district of Mersin Province, Turkey. It is in the wide valley of Göksu River in Toros Mountains. The population of the village was 719 as of 2011.

References

Villages in Mut District